"No Words" is a song written by Paul McCartney and Denny Laine, and first released on 7 December 1973 on Band on the Run by Paul McCartney and Wings. The song was Laine's first co-writing on a Wings album and his only writing credit on Band on the Run.

Background 
The song was written before the release of Wings' second album, Red Rose Speedway, but not recorded until the Band on the Run sessions.

Recording 
The basic track was recorded in Lagos, Nigeria and was later completed in September in England. The orchestral arrangements, consisting of brass instruments and string quartets were made by Tony Visconti. Ian Horne and Trevor Jones, two of Wings' roadies, sang backing vocals on the track although their parts are buried in the mix.  Otherwise, the vocals consist primarily of Laine and Paul and Linda McCartney all singing together, with Laine and Paul McCartney each taking a solo spot.

The song's verses are in the key of A major.  The key moves to the dominant, E major, for the refrain.

The lyrics express the singer's desire for a woman who he fears may not be only interested in him.  The refrain consists of the single line "No words for my love."  Music author Vincent Benitex interprets the song's ending on a dominant key rather than the tonic as reflecting the singer's uncertain situation.  Robert Rodriguez described "No Words" as being the only song on Band on the Run that came close to being the type of "silly love song" that predominated McCartney's albums of the time.

Live performances 
The only time the song was performed live by Wings was in 1979 during their final tour.

Personnel 
 Paul McCartney – vocals, guitar, bass guitar, drums
 Linda McCartney – vocals, keyboards
 Denny Laine – vocals, guitar
 Ian Horne – backing vocals
 Trevor Jones – backing vocals
Personnel per The Beatles Bible.

References 

1973 songs
Paul McCartney and Wings songs
Songs written by Paul McCartney
Songs written by Denny Laine
Song recordings produced by Paul McCartney
Music published by MPL Music Publishing